Monroeville is a town in Monroe Township, Allen County, Indiana, United States. The population was 1,235 as of the 2010 census.

History
Monroeville was platted in 1851. It was named from Monroe Township. A post office was established at Monroeville in 1856.

Geography
Monroeville is located at  (40.972799, -84.868598).

Demographics

2010 census
As of the census of 2010, there were 1,235 people, 491 households, and 309 families living in the town. The racial makeup of the town was 98.9% White, 0.1% Pacific Islander, 0.4% from other races, and 0.6% from two or more races. Hispanic or Latino of any race were 1.9% of the population.

There were 491 households, of which 28.9% had children under the age of 18 living with them, 45.8% were married couples living together, 12.4% had a female householder with no husband present, 4.7% had a male householder with no wife present, and 37.1% were non-families. 32.0% of all households were made up of individuals, and 15.7% had someone living alone who was 65 years of age or older. The average household size was 2.40 and the average family size was 3.04.

The median age in the town was 42.3 years. 22.2% of residents were under the age of 18; 9.4% were between the ages of 18 and 24; 22.9% were from 25 to 44; 25.7% were from 45 to 64; and 19.9% were 65 years of age or older. The gender makeup of the town was 47.1% male and 52.9% female.

2000 census
As of the census of 2000, there were 1,236 people, 463 households, and 325 families living in the town. The racial makeup of the town was 96.76% White, 0.16% Asian, 0.49% from other races, and 2.59% from two or more races. Hispanic or Latino of any race were 2.27% of the population.

There were 463 households, out of which 37.6% had children under the age of 18 living with them, 53.6% were married couples living together, 12.1% had a female householder with no husband present, and 29.6% were non-families. 24.8% of all households were made up of individuals, and 12.1% had someone living alone who was 65 years of age or older. The average household size was 2.66 and the average family size was 3.20.

In the town, the population was spread out, with 29.8% under the age of 18, 7.9% from 18 to 24, 30.8% from 25 to 44, 17.6% from 45 to 64, and 13.8% who were 65 years of age or older. The median age was 33 years. For every 100 females, there were 93.7 males. For every 100 females age 18 and over, there were 90.8 males.

The median income for a household in the town was $35,795, and the median income for a family was $41,310. Males had a median income of $31,534 versus $24,853 for females. The per capita income for the town was $16,242. About 6.5% of families and 10.0% of the population were below the poverty line, including 10.9% of those under age 18 and 15.8% of those age 65 or over.

Education
The East Allen County Schools district includes Monroeville, and Heritage Elementary School and Heritage Junior/Senior High School are the facilities Monroeville is zoned to.

Monroeville has a public library, a branch of the Allen County Public Library.

Arts and culture
Monroeville is a popular stop for bicycle tourists traveling on the Adventure Cycling Association routes. The Monroeville Community Center, which provides cyclist-only lodging, showers, and laundry facilities, was awarded the 2005 Trail Angel Award by the Adventure Cycling Association.

Media
Monroeville News, weekly community newspaper
Fort Wayne Observed news and commentary weblog

Notable people
 Lloyd C. Douglas, author

References

External links

 

Towns in Allen County, Indiana
Towns in Indiana
Fort Wayne, IN Metropolitan Statistical Area